Pitiscus is a surname.  Notable people with the surname include:

 Bartholomaeus Pitiscus (1561–1613), German trigonometrist, astronomer, and theologian
 Samuel Pitiscus (1637–1727), Dutch historian and classicist, nephew of Bartholomaeus

See also
 Pitiscus (crater)